Jack Leonard Shadbolt,  (February 4, 1909 November 22, 1998) was a Canadian painter.

Early life
Born in Shoeburyness, England, Shadbolt came to Canada with his parents in April 1911.  He was raised in Victoria, British Columbia. He studied at the Art Students' League in New York City (1948) and in London (1937) and Paris (1938). From 1928 to 1937, he taught in high schools in Duncan, British Columbia and Vancouver, British Columbia. Starting in 1938, he taught and studied with Frederick Varley at the Vancouver School of Art.

He married Doris Meisel in 1945 and the couple moved to Burnaby, a suburb of Vancouver, in 1950.

War artist
In 1942, during World War II, Jack Shadbolt enlisted in the army. He was transferred in 1945 to London, where he served as an administrative officer for the official Canadian War Art Program.

Later years
After the war, Shadbolt returned to his faculty position at the Vancouver School of Art (VSA).  When he retired in 1966, he was the head of painting and drawing section. He devoted more time to painting.

In 1987, Shadbolt and his wife founded the Vancouver Institute for the Visual Arts, a charitable foundation to provide grants to individuals in support of their artistic endeavours. The foundation was later renamed The Jack and Doris Shadbolt Foundation for the Visual Arts.

Recognition
In 1956, works by Shadbolt along with those of Louis Archambault and Harold Town represented Canada at the Venice Biennale. In 1972, he was made an Officer of the Order of Canada. In 1990, he was awarded the Order of British Columbia. Throughout his life, Shadbolt continued to advance the boundaries of his art.

On 24 August 2001 Canada Post issued 'The Space Between Columns #21 (Italian), 1965, Jack Shadbolt' in the Masterpieces of Canadian art series. The stamp was designed by Pierre-Yves Pelletier based on an oil painting "'The Space Between Columns #21 (1965) by Jack Shadbolt. The $1.05  stamps are perforated 13 X 13.5 mm and were printed by Ashton-Potter Limited.

The Shadbolt Centre for the Arts located at Deer Lake Park was named after Jack Shadbolt and offers performing and visual arts programs for people of all ages as well as facilitates Royal Conservatory of Music examinations.

Selected works

 1961 — Villa in the Countryside
 1963 — Bush Pilot in Northern Sky, mural at Edmonton International Airport
 1968 — In Search of Form
 1970 — Miracle Of Birds
 1970 — Man Of Symbol
 1970 — Night Fears
 1971 — Adjustable Venus
 1971-1972 — To Old Gardens
 1972 — Guardian
 1972 — Little Wolf
 1972 — Little Bride
 1972 — Daughter Of Chiefs
 1972 — Ritual Of The Arrow
 1972 — World Behind
 1972 — Place
 1973 — Mind's I
 1973 — The Way In
 1973 — Lost World
 1974 — Mystery Of Flower
 1974 — Bride
 1974 — Galaxy
 1974 — Sinbad's Voyages
 1974 — Transformations No. 3
 1976 — Variation On A Kwakiutl Ghost Mask
 1976 — India Suite
 1976 — Transformations No. 5
 1976-1977 — Lodi Gardens
 1976-1977 — Morning East
 1977 — Trees And Rock
 1977 — Erotic Landscape
 1977 — Dark Landscape
 1977 — Classic Landscape
 1977 — Mountain Summer (End Flight)
 1977 — For Vladimir
 1977 — Sea Edge Nocturne
 1977 — High Country Event
 1977 — High Range Country
 1977 — Event On The Rocks
 1981 — Act of Art

See also
 Canadian official war artists
 War artist
 War art

References

Bibliography 
 Reid, Dennis R. (1988). A Concise History of Canadian Painting. Toronto: Oxford University Press. ; ;   OCLC 18378555

 Lindberg, Ted. Jack Shadbolt : Seven Years. Vancouver Art Gallery, 1978.

External links
 Jack and Doris Shadbolt Foundation for the Visual Arts
 Jack Shadbolt: Works from the Collection of the Morris and Helen Belkin Art Gallery

Further reading
 Watson, Scott. (1990). Jack Shadbolt. Vancouver: Douglas & McIntyre. ; ;  OCLC 24544021
 Watson, Scott. (1994). Jack Shadbolt: Drawings. Vancouver: Douglas & McIntyre. ; ; OCLC 214919223 
 Shadbolt, Jack. (1973). Mind's I: poems and drawings. Toronto: McClelland and Stewart Limited. ; ; OCLC 231778128 
 Halpin, Marjorie M. (1986). Jack Shadbolt, and the Coastal Indian Image. Vancouver: University of British Columbia Press. ; ; OCLC 14816437
 Shadbolt, Jack. (1969). Jack Shadbolt. Ottawa: National Gallery of Canada. OCLC 177007271
 Henry, Karen and Wallace, Rory. (1996). Counterpoint: The Prints of Jack Shadbolt. Burnaby: Burnaby Art Gallery. ; ; OCLC 855384703
 Ainslie, Patricia. (1991). Correspondences: Jack Shadbolt. Calgary: Glenbow Museum. ; ; OCLC 27221402

1909 births
1998 deaths
Military personnel from Essex
Canadian Army personnel of World War II
Canadian Army officers
Artists from Victoria, British Columbia
British emigrants to Canada
Canadian male painters
Members of the Order of British Columbia
Officers of the Order of Canada
Canadian war artists
People from Shoeburyness
Victoria College, British Columbia alumni
Emily Carr University of Art and Design alumni
World War II artists
20th-century Canadian painters
20th-century Canadian male artists